Scopula mappata is a moth of the family Geometridae. It was described by Achille Guenée in 1858. It is found in Brazil and northern Argentina.

References

Moths described in 1858
mappata
Moths of South America
Taxa named by Achille Guenée